Bowen Peak is a mountain located near Queenstown, New Zealand.

See also
List of mountains of New Zealand by height

References

Mountains of Otago
Queenstown-Lakes District
Southern Alps